Jang Min-chul (born June 17, 1991), better known as MC, is a former Korean professional StarCraft II player, playing as the Protoss faction. MC has accumulated more than $500,000 in tournament winnings, and won the Global StarCraft II League (GSL) championship twice. In 2014, Red Bull Esports called him "one of the most successful StarCraft 2 players ever".

Starcraft II Career

Old generations (2010-2012)
He has experienced similar success in Europe, winning 2011 DreamHack Stockholm Invitational and Copenhagen Games Spring 2011, while taking silver in IEM Season VI - Global Challenge Cologne.

SK Gaming (2012-2013)
In July 2011, Min Chul who was playing for the Korean team Old Generations (oGs), began representing SK Gaming in foreign events. In January 2012, this partnership ended with Min Chul leaving Old Generations and moving to play for SK Gaming full-time. He would remain with SK until the end of 2013, when the organization announced his departure.

Free agent (2014-present)
Following his departure from SK Gaming at the end of 2013, MC announced that he would continue to work with his former manager at SK Gaming, but would not join a new professional team.

On June 18, 2015, MC announced his retirement via Twitter.

League of Legends career 
On November 2, 2016, it was announced that MC would coach Kongdoo's League of Legends team.

References

External links
Profile and game record
Twitter
Livestream

1991 births
Living people
StarCraft players
South Korean esports players
SK Gaming players
CJ Entus players
League of Legends coaches